Sivert Andreas Nielsen may refer to:

Sivert Andreas Nielsen (1823-1904), Norwegian politician
Sivert Andreas Nielsen (1916-2004), Norwegian diplomat, politician and banker